Sevuloni Lasei Reece (born 13 February 1997) is a Fijian born New Zealand rugby union player who currently plays as a wing for the Crusaders in Super Rugby and  in the Bunnings NPC. He also plays for the All Blacks internationally.

Early career

Reece was born and raised in Fiji and attended Queen Victoria School. He represented the school in rugby and track and field in the Coke Games. He was a high jumper and a 100m sprinter. He finished 5th in the High Jump in his category in his last year in school with a jump of 1.70m. He also finished 3rd with his 4x100m relay team. Reece moved to New Zealand in 2014 and attended Hamilton Boys' High School where he played first 15 rugby.   After graduating high school, local Waikato club Melville signed him up on a development contract. In  2016, he finished as the club's top points scorer as they lifted the Breweries Shield for the first time in 35 years.

Professional career

Excellent performances as a centre and outside back for Melville saw him called up to the  squad for the 2016 Mitre 10 Cup. He debuted in a Ranfurly Shield defence against Thames Valley on 6 June 2016 and went on to make 12 Ranfurly Shield and Mitre 10 Cup appearances during the season, scoring 7 tries in the process.

Irish Pro14 club Connacht announced the signing of Reece in May 2018. He was set to join his new team after completing his Waikato commitments in the 2018 Mitre 10 Cup, however, in October 2018 it was announced that Connacht had decided to not go along with the deal in light of a domestic violence case against Reece, in which he pleaded guilty and was discharged without conviction.

In December 2018, Reece was called up to the Crusaders squad as a cover and was later added to the main team after strong performances in the pre season, but after a career ending injury to  Israel Dagg, Reece was brought into the main squad. In March 2019, he made his debut on the right wing against the Chiefs as a cover for Manasa Mataele who was injured the previous week and ruled out for the season. He scored an intercept try as well as winning the Man of the Match. He became a starter on the right wing for the remainder of the season scoring 15 tries and topping the try scoring charts for the 2019 Super Rugby season.

In July 2019, Reece was named in the 39 member All Blacks team to prepare for the Rugby Championship and the 2019 Rugby World Cup.

He was named in the North Island squad for the North vs South rugby union match in 2020, starting in the number 14 jersey in a 35-38 loss for the North.

Reece was named in the Tasman Mako squad for the 2020 Mitre 10 Cup making his debut for the Mako in Round 1 against .

Reece was part of the  side that won the 2021 Super Rugby Aotearoa season, scoring a try in the final as the side won their fifth title in a row.

Domestic abuse and controversy 
In the early hours of July 1, 2018, a heavily intoxicated Reece got into an argument with his partner of two years in the Hamilton central business district. Reece yelled at his partner to "shut up, in much more colourful language than that", according to the court statement, and chased her down the street, dragging her to the ground. She suffered bruising to the side of her face and waist and bleeding to her knee.

He was subsequently granted a discharge without conviction in order for him to take up a contract in Ireland, by Judge Denise Clark in the Hamilton District Court. Judge Clark accepted that the victim had forgiven Reece, that the couple were undergoing counselling, Reece had admitted a problem with alcohol and had been sober for three months.

Reece expressed remorse and apologised at a restorative justice meeting. Judge Denise Clark imposed a NZ$750 fine when a letter from Connacht, confirming the contract offer would be withdrawn if he was convicted, was read in court.

Many Pro-Law enforcement patriots protested in the streets of Christchurch after news broke that he would sign with the Crusaders.

References

External links

1997 births
Living people
People educated at Hamilton Boys' High School
Fijian rugby union players
Waikato rugby union players
Rugby union wings
Fijian emigrants to New Zealand
Crusaders (rugby union) players
Sportspeople from Nadi
New Zealand international rugby union players

Tasman rugby union players
New Zealand rugby union players